Smlednik is a village on the left bank of the Sava River in the Municipality of Medvode in the Upper Carniola region of Slovenia.

Smlednik is the site of the 18-hole Diners Golf Ljubljana golf course. It can accommodate up to 120 players at the same time.

Name
Smlednik was attested in written sources in 1136 as Fledinich (and as Vlednich in 1214 and Vlednic in 1228). The origin of the name is unclear. A possible derivation is from the common noun  'hog's fennel', referring to the local vegetation. Other explanations include the obsolete Slovene common noun  'watchpost', or the root *mlědъ 'deciduous woods' or 'sparse woods', but neither of these is linguistically convincing. In the past the German name was Flödnig.

Church

The parish church in the settlement is dedicated to Saint Ulrich.

References

External links

Smlednik on Geopedia

Populated places in the Municipality of Medvode